Edward Lithgow Smart (9 December 1862 – 28 November 1948) was a plumber and member of the Queensland Legislative Assembly.

Biography
Smart was born at Ipswich, Queensland, to parents Thomas Smart and his wife Elizabeth (née Ball). He attended Toowoomba State School and became an apprentice plumber. He acquired his own plumbing business in 1885 and eventually became a director of the Sugarloaf Colliery Company.

On 11 April 1895 he married Emma Jessie Hunt (died 1939) and together had three sons and two daughters. He died in November 1948 and was buried in the Drayton and Toowoomba Cemetery.

Political career
Smart, who was a member of the Independent Order of Rechabites, was an Alderman on the Toowoomba City Council from 1894 until 1900. When one of the sitting members for the Queensland state seat of Drayton & Toowoomba, John Fogarty died in 1904, Smart, representing the Labour Party, won the resulting by-election. He held the seat for three years, declining to stand at the 1907 state election.

References

Members of the Queensland Legislative Assembly
1862 births
1948 deaths
Australian plumbers
Queensland local councillors
People from Ipswich, Queensland
Australian builders
Australian Labor Party members of the Parliament of Queensland